Auricularia nigricans  is a species of fungus in the family Auriculariaceae. Basidiocarps (fruitbodies} are gelatinous, ear-like, and grow on dead wood of broadleaf trees. It is an American species, known from Louisiana and the Caribbean south to Argentina, and was formerly confused with the similar Asian species Auricularia polytricha, originally described from India.

Taxonomy 
The species was first described in 1788 as Peziza nigrescens by the Swedish botanist Olof Swartz, based on a collection he made from Jamaica. In a later publication he changed the name to Peziza nigricans, which was accepted by the Swedish mycologist Elias Magnus Fries. For abstruse nomenclatural reasons, Fries's sanctioned name takes priority over Swartz's original name. In his monograph of Auricularia species, American mycologist Bernard Lowy rejected the name as being "doubtful", preferring to call the species Auricularia polytricha. Olof Swartz's original collection still exists, however, enabling the identity of his species to be confirmed. Molecular research, based on cladistic analysis of DNA sequences, has shown that Auricularia nigricans is distinct.

Description 
The fruitbodies occur singly or in clusters. The upper surface is densely tomentose and ash-grey to yellowish brown. The spore-bearing underside is smooth and pinkish to brown.

Microscopic characters 
The microscopic characters are typical of the genus Auricularia. The basidia are tubular, laterally septate, 50–75 × 3-6.5 µm. The spores are allantoid (sausage-shaped), 14.5–17 × 5–7 µm. The surface hairs are 650–1080 µm long.

Similar species 
Auricularia cornea is similar but has much shorter surface hairs 200–400 µm long.

Habitat and distribution 
Auricularia nigricans is a wood-rotting species, typically found on dead attached or fallen wood of broadleaf trees. It is widely distributed in the Americas, from Louisiana and the Caribbean south to Argentina, but is not currently known elsewhere.

References 

Auriculariales
Fungi of South America
Fungi of the Caribbean